The Weibull modulus is a dimensionless parameter of the Weibull distribution which is used to describe variability in measured material strength of brittle materials. 

For ceramics and other brittle materials, the maximum stress that a sample can be measured to withstand before failure may vary from specimen to specimen, even under identical testing conditions. This is related to the distribution of physical flaws present in the surface or body of the brittle specimen, since brittle failure processes originate at these weak points. When flaws are consistent and evenly distributed, samples will behave more uniformly than when flaws are clustered inconsistently. This must be taken into account when describing the strength of the material, so strength is best represented as a distribution of values rather than as one specific value. The Weibull modulus is a shape parameter for the Weibull distribution model which, in this case, maps the probability of failure of a component at varying stresses.

Consider strength measurements made on many small samples of a brittle ceramic material. If the measurements show little variation from sample to sample, the calculated Weibull modulus will be high and a single strength value would serve as a good description of the sample-to-sample performance. It may be concluded that its physical flaws, whether inherent to the material itself or resulting from the manufacturing process, are distributed uniformly throughout the material. If the measurements show high variation, the calculated Weibull modulus will be low; this reveals that flaws are clustered inconsistently and the measured strength will be generally weak and variable. Products made from components of low Weibull modulus will exhibit low reliability and their strengths will be broadly distributed.

Test procedures for determining the Weibull modulus are specified in DIN EN 843-5 and DIN 51 110-3.

A further method to determine the strength of brittle materials has been described by the Wikibook contribution Weakest link determination by use of three parameter Weibull statistics.

Definition

If the probability distribution of the strength, X, is a Weibull distribution with its density given by 

then k is the Weibull modulus.

The value of k shows the kind of failure being experienced. If k<1, then the failure rate decreases with time. This implies that the weak and defective parts fail in the beginning, with the harder sections surviving. If k=1, the rate of failure remains constant. This implies that there is random failure occurring. Thus, there should be some external factor strong enough to cause random failure irrespective of whether the section is strong or weak. If the value of k>1, the rate of failure increases over time. This points to some kind of ageing process, the weakening of the material with the passage of time.

References
Afferrante L. et al. (2006) "Is Weibull’s modulus really a material constant? Example case with interacting collinear cracks". International Journal of Solids and Structures, 43(17). 
Klein, C.A (2009) "Characteristic strength, Weibull modulus, and failure probability of fused silica glass". Optical Engineering, 48, 113401.

External links
Weibull modulus at Breviary Technical Ceramics

Materials science
Engineering statistics